REBEL was a world champion chess program developed by Ed Schröder. Development of REBEL started in 1980 on a TRS-80, and it was ported many times to dedicated hardware and the fastest microprocessors of the day:
1980s – Running on a TRS-80, Apple II, and inside of Mephisto brand dedicated chess computers, it won the Dutch open computer chess championship four times.
1991 – Ported to the ARM ChessMachine and named Gideon, it won the World Microcomputer Chess Championship.
1992 – Gideon won the World Computer Chess Championship, the first time a microprocessor came ahead of a field of mainframes, supercomputers, and custom chess hardware.
1990s – REBEL was ported to Microsoft DOS and then Microsoft Windows and sold commercially
1997 – REBEL won a match with GM Arthur Yusupov 10.5–6.5, the first successful challenge of a chess grandmaster by a commercial program.
1998 – REBEL won a match with GM Viswanathan Anand 5–3 (but lost 0.5–1.5 in the standard time control section of the match).  He was rated number two in the world at the time.
2004 – Ed Schröder retired, releasing the last version of REBEL as the freeware chess engine Pro Deo.

External links
Ed's recollection of REBEL's history
Wealth of information on the inner workings of a professional program
"How REBEL Plays Chess" by Ed Schröder (PDF)
Rebel (Chess Programming Wiki)

Chess engines